The Church of St Mary and St Michael is a Roman Catholic Church at 2 Lukin Street, Commercial Road, E1 0AA in the London Borough of Tower Hamlets. It is an active Roman Catholic church in the diocese of Westminster. The church is recorded in the National Heritage List for England as a designated Grade II listed building.

History
Built between 1852–1856, The Church of St Mary and St Michael was the largest Roman Catholic church in London at the time. William Wardell, its architect, was a pupil of Augustus Pugin whose influence can be seen in its Gothic Revivalist design.

Father James Webb, the last priest in England prosecuted under the Penal laws, was the first Parish Priest of St Mary and St Michael's. Canon Timothy Ring, led the parish from 1904 until 1941, and was a well-known figure in East End London, his funeral was attended by Clement Attlee.

References 

Roman Catholic churches in the London Borough of Tower Hamlets
Grade II listed Roman Catholic churches in England
Roman Catholic churches completed in 1856
1856 establishments in England
Grade II listed churches in London
William Wardell church buildings
Brick buildings and structures
Gothic Revival church buildings in London
Churches in the Roman Catholic Diocese of Westminster
19th-century Roman Catholic church buildings in the United Kingdom
Stepney